Kirby Hill, historically also known as Kirby-on-the-Hill, is a village and civil parish in the Richmondshire district of North Yorkshire, England.

The parish population is about 60. At the 2011 census, it was less than 100. Population data about Kirby Hill is now included in population data about the parish of Gayles.

Kirby Hill was a township in the parish of Kirkby Ravensworth until 1866, when it was made a separate civil parish.

As early as 1859, the centre of the village green featured "a beautiful spring". It continued to be used by residents until at least 1932. Sir Nikolaus Pevsner described Kirby Hill as "a perfect village, but ... also ... exceptional".

Parish church
The Church of England parish church of Sts Peter and Felix historically served the large ancient parish of Kirkby Ravensworth. It was built in the 12th century on the site of a previous Anglo-Saxon church.

The east window of the chancel was added in the 13th century. Several other features were added in the 14th century, including the vestry, the north aisle, the south porch, several new windows, and the west tower (built in 1397). And the clerestory and south aisle were added in the 15th century. The church is a Grade I listed building.

The tower has two bells. One is inscribed with the phrase Venite exultemus domino (Latin for "Let us come and praise the Lord", a quotation from Psalm 95), “SS 1664” (the year the bell was added), and the initials of the master founder, Samuel Smith of York.

A monument in the church commemorates a former rector, Dr John Dakyn (1497–1558), who was an archdeacon of East Riding. He took part in the Pilgrimage of Grace (and is a noted chronicler of it), but wrote that he "managed to exculpate himself".

Other notable rectors of the parish include George Fitzhugh (died 1505), who was a chancellor of Cambridge University and a dean of Lincoln; William Rokeby (died 1521), who was a lord chancellor of Ireland; and Alan Percy (circa 1480–1560), who was a master of St John's College, Cambridge.

The church also has a monument to Thomas Wycliffe, who died in 1821; he was the last surviving male descendant of the religious reformer John Wycliffe.

Grammar school

Dr John Dakyn, a 16th-century vicar of Kirby Ravensworth, left a legacy to fund the establishment of a grammar school in the village. It was built in 1556 and enlarged in 1706.

Notable alumni of the grammar school include Matthew Hutton (1693–1758), who was born in the village and was made archbishop of Canterbury in 1757; the astronomer William Lax (1761–1836) and the antiquarian and the topographer James Raine (1791–1858).

The school closed in 1957, just one year after its 400th anniversary. The former school’s building is now a private house and a Grade II* listed building.

Amenities
Kirby Hill has an 18th-century public house, the Shoulder of Mutton.

References

Bibliography

External links

Civil parishes in North Yorkshire
Villages in North Yorkshire